Spheterista oheoheana is a moth of the family Tortricidae. It was first described by Otto Swezey in 1933. It is endemic to the Hawaiian island of Kauai.

The larvae feed on Jetraplasandra kauaiensis. The larvae and pupae of the type series were collected from dead twigs.

External links

Archipini
Endemic moths of Hawaii